Perry Creek is a stream in the U.S. state of Georgia. It is a tributary to the Conasauga River.

According to tradition, the creek was named after one Sol Perry (or Perez), a settler of Spanish descent. A variant name was "Pears Creek".

References

Rivers of Georgia (U.S. state)
Rivers of Murray County, Georgia